Ronald Patrick Henry (17 August 1934 – 27 December 2014) was a footballer who played for Tottenham Hotspur, and won one cap for England. His grandson, Ronnie, is also a professional footballer.

Club career
Henry joined Tottenham in 1952 from Redbourn, and made his debut in 1955 as a centre half, but was soon converted to left back. He was a regular in Spurs' defence for many years, and his honours include being a member of The Double winning side of 1961, the 1962 FA Cup, and the European Cup Winners Cup in 1963. Overall, Henry played 247 league games for Tottenham, scoring one goal.

Honours
Tottenham Hotspur 
 Football League First Division - 1961
 FA Cup – 1961, 1962
 European Cup Winners Cup – 1963

International career
On 27 February 1963, he represented England in a European Championship qualifier against France in Paris. This turned out to be his only international appearance as England lost 5–2.

Personal life
Henry lived in Redbourn, Hertfordshire and owned a  bedding plant nursery, as well as many homing pigeons. He had remained involved with Tottenham Hotspur, as an assistant to the Under-18 side. On 27 December 2014, he died at the age of 80. There was a minute's applause for Henry before Tottenham's first game at White Hart Lane after his death, on 28 December against Manchester United.

His grandson, Ronnie Henry, currently plays for non-league side Royston Town, but is most known for his time at Stevenage, where he became the first ever captain to lift a competitive trophy at the new Wembley Stadium.

References

External links
 The Double Team
 Ron Henry article

1934 births
2014 deaths
England international footballers
English footballers
Tottenham Hotspur F.C. players
English Football League players
Footballers from Shoreditch
Association football defenders
Tottenham Hotspur F.C. non-playing staff
People from Redbourn
FA Cup Final players